Bird Island is the northernmost island in the Seychelles archipelago, 100 km from Mahe. The 0.94 km2 coral island is known for its birdlife, including sooty terns, fairy terns and common noddies, and for hawksbill and green turtles. It is now a private resort with 7 chalet-villas It also contains a small weather station and a small landing strip Bird Island Airport which connects the island with Mahe.

Bird Island used to be known as "Île aux Vaches" due to the numerous dugongs (sea cows) that lived in nearby waters. Between 1896 and 1906, 17,000 tons of guano was removed from the island and exported to Mauritius as fertilizer. The island has been a coconut plantation, and for growing cash crops such as papaya and cotton.

This island was discovered by the captain James Cook in 1775 when his Ship named The Eagle was passing by this island. He described the island covered with birds and many sea cows. He named it Bird island. In 1808, the French ship Hirondelle sank on a cliff off the northeast coast of Bird Island. Half of the 180 people on board died. The other half reached Bird Island. Six of them managed to reach  Mahé. The others were then rescued and shifted to Mahé. In 1882, a passing British ship found two Africans living on the island, salting fish and birds in what must have been the loneliest of existences. 

Since 1967 it has been privately owned by a Seychellois accountant named Guy Savy. Conservation measures have taken place such protection of birdlife and hawksbill turtle nesting sites, the eradication of feral rats and rabbits and the translocation of a population of Seychelles sunbird.

Bird Island is named in honour of its spectacular colony of around 700,000 pairs of sooty tern that nest on the island. The birds arrive from late March, laying eggs in May and remaining until October before leaving the island. Another phenomenon especially in October to December arises from the geographical location of Bird Island on the northern edge of the Seychelles Bank. This means it is the first landfall for migratory Eurasian birds and Seychelles Bird Records Committee has recorded here many species new to the country.

The world's biggest and heaviest free roaming tortoise Esmeralda lives on this island. It weighs over 670 pounds (304kg) and is thought to be as much as 170 years old. Esmeralda was named by Lyall Watson, the famous botanist/zoologist and author of Supernature.

Gallery

References

External links

Newsletter of Bird Island Wildlife
Bird Island Nature Conservation
 Seychelles Bird Records Committee

Islands of La Digue and Inner Islands
Important Bird Areas of Seychelles
Private islands of Seychelles